These are the international rankings of Uzbekistan.

International rankings

References

Uzbekistan